Arthur Emmett 'Bull' Coghlan (16 August 1902 – 8 June 1959) was an Australian rules footballer who played for and coached Geelong in the VFL.

Family
His brother, Michael Davitt Coghlan (1907-1964), played with Fitzroy in the VFL.

Football

Geelong's Toora recruit was a tough and hard hitting ruckman but could also play in key positions.

He missed out on their 1925 premiership after being suspended for the remainder of 1925 and all of 1926 for escalating an all-in brawl that involved players and team officials. North Melbourne's Fred Rutley was suspended for life for starting the brawl.

In 1929 he was appointed captain-coach and in his second season in this role steered Geelong to a Grand Final. They lost the match to Collingwood by 30 points but he played in a premiership the following season, albeit this time as neither captain nor coach.

He played his final game in 1932 and in 1933 became the non-playing coach of Geelong, making it all the way to the Preliminary Final in both of his two seasons.

Notes

External links

1902 births
1959 deaths
Australian rules footballers from Melbourne
Australian Rules footballers: place kick exponents
Geelong Football Club players
Geelong Football Club Premiership players
Geelong Football Club coaches
One-time VFL/AFL Premiership players
People from Coburg, Victoria